The 2023 Minnesota Twins season  will be the 63rd season for the Minnesota Twins franchise in the Twin Cities of Minnesota, their 14th season at Target Field, and the 123rd overall in the American League.

Offseason

Rule changes 
Pursuant to the CBA, new rule changes will be in place for the 2023 season:

 institution of a pitch clock between pitches;
 limits on pickoff attempts per plate appearance;
 limits on defensive shifts requiring two infielders to be on either side of second and be within the boundary of the infield; and
 larger bases (increased to 18-inch squares);

New Uniforms 
On November 18, 2022, the team unveiled its first complete uniform redesign since 1987. Along with the 4 brand new uniform designs, the team unveiled an altered "TC" logo and an "M" logo featuring a red North Star.

Regular season

Game Log

|- style="background: 
| 1 || March 30 || @ Royals || – || || || — || || – ||
|- style="background: 
| 2 || April 1 || @ Royals || – || || || — || || – ||
|- style="background: 
| 3 || April 2 || @ Royals || – || || || — || || – ||
|- style="background: 
| 4 || April 3 || @ Marlins || – || || || — || || – ||
|- style="background: 
| 5 || April 4 || @ Marlins || – || || || — || || – ||
|- style="background: 
| 6 || April 5 || @ Marlins || – || || || — || || – ||
|- style="background: 
| 7 || April 6 || Astros || – || || || — || || – ||
|- style="background: 
| 8 || April 8 || Astros || – || || || — || || – ||
|- style="background: 
| 9 || April 9 || Astros || – || || || — || || – ||
|- style="background: 
| 10 || April 10 || White Sox || – || || || — || || – ||
|- style="background: 
| 11 || April 11 || White Sox || – || || || — || || – ||
|- style="background: 
| 12 || April 12 || White Sox || – || || || — || || – ||
|- style="background: 
| 13 || April 13 || @ Yankees || – || || || — || || – ||
|- style="background: 
| 14 || April 14 || @ Yankees || – || || || — || || – ||
|- style="background: 
| 15 || April 15 || @ Yankees || – || || || — || || – ||
|- style="background: 
| 16 || April 16 || @ Yankees || – || || || — || || – ||
|- style="background: 
| 17 || April 18 || @ Red Sox || – || || || — || || – ||
|- style="background: 
| 18 || April 19 || @ Red Sox || – || || || — || || – ||
|- style="background: 
| 19 || April 20 || @ Red Sox || – || || || — || || – ||
|- style="background: 
| 20 || April 21 || Nationals || – || || || — || || – ||
|- style="background: 
| 21 || April 22 || Nationals || – || || || — || || – ||
|- style="background: 
| 22 || April 23 || Nationals || – || || || — || || – ||
|- style="background: 
| 23 || April 24 || Yankees || – || || || — || || – ||
|- style="background: 
| 24 || April 25 || Yankees || – || || || — || || – ||
|- style="background: 
| 25 || April 26 || Yankees || – || || || — || || – ||
|- style="background: 
| 26 || April 27 || Royals || – || || || — || || – ||
|- style="background: 
| 27 || April 28 || Royals || – || || || — || || – ||
|- style="background: 
| 28 || April 29 || Royals || – || || || — || || – ||
|- style="background: 
| 29 || April 30 || Royals || – || || || — || || – ||
|- 
 

|- style="background: 
| 30 || May 2 || @ White Sox || – || || || — || || – ||
|- style="background: 
| 31 || May 3 || @ White Sox || – || || || — || || – ||
|- style="background: 
| 32 || May 4 || @ White Sox || – || || || — || || – ||
|- style="background: 
| 33 || May 5 || @ Guardians || – || || || — || || – ||
|- style="background: 
| 34 || May 6 || @ Guardians || – || || || — || || – ||
|- style="background: 
| 35 || May 7 || @ Guardians || – || || || — || || – ||
|- style="background: 
| 36 || May 9 || Padres || – || || || — || || – ||
|- style="background: 
| 37 || May 10 || Padres || – || || || — || || – ||
|- style="background: 
| 38 || May 11 || Padres || – || || || — || || – ||
|- style="background: 
| 39 || May 12 || Cubs || – || || || — || || – ||
|- style="background: 
| 40 || May 13 || Cubs || – || || || — || || – ||
|- style="background: 
| 41 || May 14 || Cubs || – || || || — || || – ||
|- style="background: 
| 42 || May 15 || @ Dodgers || – || || || — || || – ||
|- style="background: 
| 43 || May 16 || @ Dodgers || – || || || — || || – ||
|- style="background: 
| 44 || May 17 || @ Dodgers || – || || || — || || – ||
|- style="background: 
| 45 || May 19 || @ Angels || – || || || — || || – ||
|- style="background: 
| 46 || May 20 || @ Angels || – || || || — || || – ||
|- style="background: 
| 47 || May 21 || @ Angels || – || || || — || || – ||
|- style="background: 
| 48 || May 22 || Giants || – || || || — || || – ||
|- style="background: 
| 49 || May 23 || Giants || – || || || — || || – ||
|- style="background: 
| 50 || May 24 || Giants || – || || || — || || – ||
|- style="background: 
| 51 || May 26 || Blue Jays || – || || || — || || – ||
|- style="background: 
| 52 || May 27 || Blue Jays || – || || || — || || – ||
|- style="background: 
| 53 || May 28 || Blue Jays || – || || || — || || – ||
|- style="background: 
| 54 || May 29 || @ Astros || – || || || — || || – ||
|- style="background: 
| 55 || May 30 || @ Astros || – || || || — || || – ||
|- style="background: 
| 56 || May 31 || @ Astros || – || || || — || || – ||
|- 
 

|- style="background: 
| 57 || June 1 || Guardians || – || || || — || || – ||
|- style="background: 
| 58 || June 2 || Guardians || – || || || — || || – ||
|- style="background: 
| 59 || June 3 || Guardians || – || || || — || || – ||
|- style="background: 
| 60 || June 4 || Guardians || – || || || — || || – ||
|- style="background: 
| 61 || June 6 || @ Rays || – || || || — || || – ||
|- style="background: 
| 62 || June 7 || @ Rays || – || || || — || || – ||
|- style="background: 
| 63 || June 8 || @ Rays || – || || || — || || – ||
|- style="background: 
| 64 || June 9 || @ Blue Jays || – || || || — || || – ||
|- style="background: 
| 65 || June 10 || @ Blue Jays || – || || || — || || – ||
|- style="background: 
| 66 || June 11 || @ Blue Jays || – || || || — || || – ||
|- style="background: 
| 67 || June 13 || Brewers || – || || || — || || – ||
|- style="background: 
| 68 || June 14 || Brewers || – || || || — || || – ||
|- style="background: 
| 69 || June 15 || Tigers || – || || || — || || – ||
|- style="background: 
| 70 || June 16 || Tigers || – || || || — || || – ||
|- style="background: 
| 71 || June 17 || Tigers || – || || || — || || – ||
|- style="background: 
| 72 || June 18 || Tigers || – || || || — || || – ||
|- style="background: 
| 73 || June 19 || Red Sox || – || || || — || || – ||
|- style="background: 
| 74 || June 20 || Red Sox || – || || || — || || – ||
|- style="background: 
| 75 || June 21 || Red Sox || – || || || — || || – ||
|- style="background: 
| 76 || June 22 || Red Sox || – || || || — || || – ||
|- style="background: 
| 77 || June 23 || @ Tigers || – || || || — || || – ||
|- style="background: 
| 78 || June 24 || @ Tigers || – || || || — || || – ||
|- style="background: 
| 79 || June 25 || @ Tigers || – || || || — || || – ||
|- style="background: 
| 80 || June 26 || @ Braves || – || || || — || || – ||
|- style="background: 
| 81 || June 27 || @ Braves || – || || || — || || – ||
|- style="background: 
| 82 || June 28 || @ Braves || – || || || — || || – ||
|- style="background: 
| 83 || June 30 || @ Orioles || – || || || — || || – ||
|- 
 

|- style="background: 
| 84 || July 1 || @ Orioles || – || || || — || || – ||
|- style="background: 
| 85 || July 2 || @ Orioles || – || || || — || || – ||
|- style="background: 
| 86 || July 3 || Royals || – || || || — || || – ||
|- style="background: 
| 87 || July 4 || Royals || – || || || — || || – ||
|- style="background: 
| 88 || July 5 || Royals || – || || || — || || – ||
|- style="background: 
| 89 || July 7 || Orioles || – || || || — || || – ||
|- style="background: 
| 90 || July 8 || Orioles || – || || || — || || – ||
|- style="background: 
| 91 || July 9 || Orioles || – || || || — || || – ||
|- style=background:#bcf
| ASG || July 11 || NL @ AL || – || || || || || || 
|- style="background: 
| 92 || July 14 || @ Athletics || – || || || — || || – ||
|- style="background: 
| 93 || July 15 || @ Athletics || – || || || — || || – ||
|- style="background: 
| 94 || July 16 || @ Athletics || – || || || — || || – ||
|- style="background: 
| 95 || July 17 || @ Mariners || – || || || — || || – ||
|- style="background: 
| 96 || July 18 || @ Mariners || – || || || — || || – ||
|- style="background: 
| 97 || July 19 || @ Mariners || – || || || — || || – ||
|- style="background: 
| 98 || July 20 || @ Mariners || – || || || — || || – ||
|- style="background: 
| 99 || July 21 || White Sox || – || || || — || || – ||
|- style="background: 
| 100 || July 22 || White Sox || – || || || — || || – ||
|- style="background: 
| 101 || July 23 || White Sox || – || || || — || || – ||
|- style="background: 
| 102 || July 24 || Mariners || – || || || — || || – ||
|- style="background: 
| 103 || July 25 || Mariners || – || || || — || || – ||
|- style="background: 
| 104 || July 26 || Mariners || – || || || — || || – ||
|- style="background: 
| 105 || July 28 || @ Royals || – || || || — || || – ||
|- style="background: 
| 106 || July 29 || @ Royals || – || || || — || || – ||
|- style="background: 
| 107 || July 30 || @ Royals || – || || || — || || – ||
|- 
 

|- style="background: 
| 108 || August 1 || @ Cardinals || – || || || — || || – ||
|- style="background: 
| 109 || August 2 || @ Cardinals || – || || || — || || – ||
|- style="background: 
| 110 || August 3 || @ Cardinals || – || || || — || || – ||
|- style="background: 
| 111 || August 4 || Diamondbacks || – || || || — || || – ||
|- style="background: 
| 112 || August 5 || Diamondbacks || – || || || — || || – ||
|- style="background: 
| 113 || August 6 || Diamondbacks || – || || || — || || – ||
|- style="background: 
| 114 || August 7 || @ Tigers || – || || || — || || – ||
|- style="background: 
| 115 || August 8 || @ Tigers || – || || || — || || – ||
|- style="background: 
| 116 || August 9 || @ Tigers || – || || || — || || – ||
|- style="background: 
| 117 || August 10 || @ Tigers || – || || || — || || – ||
|- style="background: 
| 118 || August 11 || @ Phillies || – || || || — || || – ||
|- style="background: 
| 119 || August 12 || @ Phillies || – || || || — || || – ||
|- style="background: 
| 120 || August 13 || @ Phillies || – || || || — || || – ||
|- style="background: 
| 121 || August 15 || Tigers || – || || || — || || – ||
|- style="background: 
| 122 || August 16 || Tigers || – || || || — || || – ||
|- style="background: 
| 123 || August 18 || Pirates || – || || || — || || – ||
|- style="background: 
| 124 || August 19 || Pirates || – || || || — || || – ||
|- style="background: 
| 125 || August 20 || Pirates || – || || || — || || – ||
|- style="background: 
| 126 || August 22 || @ Brewers || – || || || — || || – ||
|- style="background: 
| 127 || August 23 || @ Brewers || – || || || — || || – ||
|- style="background: 
| 128 || August 24 || Rangers || – || || || — || || – ||
|- style="background: 
| 129 || August 25 || Rangers || – || || || — || || – ||
|- style="background: 
| 130 || August 26 || Rangers || – || || || — || || – ||
|- style="background: 
| 131 || August 27 || Rangers || – || || || — || || – ||
|- style="background: 
| 132 || August 28 || Guardians || – || || || — || || – ||
|- style="background: 
| 133 || August 29 || Guardians || – || || || — || || – ||
|- style="background: 
| 134 || August 30 || Guardians || – || || || — || || – ||
|- 
 

|- style="background: 
| 135 || September 1 || @ Rangers || – || || || — || || – ||
|- style="background: 
| 136 || September 2 || @ Rangers || – || || || — || || – ||
|- style="background: 
| 137 || September 3 || @ Rangers || – || || || — || || – ||
|- style="background: 
| 138 || September 4 || @ Guardians || – || || || — || || – ||
|- style="background: 
| 139 || September 5 || @ Guardians || – || || || — || || – ||
|- style="background: 
| 140 || September 6 || @ Guardians || – || || || — || || – ||
|- style="background: 
| 141 || September 8 || Mets || – || || || — || || – ||
|- style="background: 
| 142 || September 9 || Mets || – || || || — || || – ||
|- style="background: 
| 143 || September 10 || Mets || – || || || — || || – ||
|- style="background: 
| 144 || September 11 || Rays || – || || || — || || – ||
|- style="background: 
| 145 || September 12 || Rays || – || || || — || || – ||
|- style="background: 
| 146 || September 13 || Rays || – || || || — || || – ||
|- style="background: 
| 147 || September 14 || @ White Sox || – || || || — || || – ||
|- style="background: 
| 148 || September 15 || @ White Sox || – || || || — || || – ||
|- style="background: 
| 149 || September 16 || @ White Sox || – || || || — || || – ||
|- style="background: 
| 150 || September 17 || @ White Sox || – || || || — || || – ||
|- style="background: 
| 151 || September 18 || @ Reds || – || || || — || || – ||
|- style="background: 
| 152 || September 19 || @ Reds || – || || || — || || – ||
|- style="background: 
| 153 || September 20 || @ Reds || – || || || — || || – ||
|- style="background: 
| 154 || September 22 || Angels || – || || || — || || – ||
|- style="background: 
| 155 || September 23 || Angels || – || || || — || || – ||
|- style="background: 
| 156 || September 24 || Angels || – || || || — || || – ||
|- style="background: 
| 157 || September 26 || Athletics || – || || || — || || – ||
|- style="background: 
| 158 || September 27 || Athletics || – || || || — || || – ||
|- style="background: 
| 159 || September 28 || Athletics || – || || || — || || – ||
|- style="background: 
| 160 || September 29 || @ Rockies || – || || || — || || – ||
|- style="background: 
| 161 || September 30 || @ Rockies || – || || || — || || – ||
|- style="background: 
| 162 || October 1 || @ Rockies || – || || || — || || – ||
|-

Roster

Farm system

References

External links
2023 Minnesota Twins season at Baseball Reference

2023
2023 Major League Baseball season
2023 in sports in Minnesota